Gabriel Lund (4 October 1773  –   3  November 1832) was a Norwegian merchant and representative at the Norwegian Constituent Assembly.

Biography
Gabriel Jochumsen Lund was born in Farsund in Vest-Agder, Norway. He graduated with a degree in theology in 1795 but did not join the ministry. He was engaged in trade in Farsund with his father, merchant, trader and shipowner Jochum Brinch Lund (1743-1807)  He subsequently took over the trading house and ran it until 1830. Later he served as postmaster in Trondheim. He represented Lister amt at the Norwegian Constituent Assembly in 1814. He was a member of the Finance Committee and supported the independence party (Selvstendighetspartiet).

He was a member of the Parliament of Norway from 1827 to 1830 representing Lister and Mandals amt (now Vest-Agder).

He was married to  Gidsken Edvardine Røring (1781-1841) with whom he had seven children. The family resided at Husan Manor in Farsund which had been built by Jochum Brinch Lund ca 1800. The original wooden structure was  partially destroyed by fire in 1940. It was later restored and is now in use as the Farsund City Hall (Husan, Farsunds rådhus). In 1990, the city of Farsund received the “Europa Nostra”  prize for the successful restoration of the former manor house.

References

Other sources
Abrahamsen, Olav Arild (1997)  Farsund bys historie (Farsund kommune)

Related Reading
Stylegard, Frans-Arne (2014) Gabriel Lund og Husan i Farsund in   De kom fra alle kanter - Eidsvollsmennene og deres hus (edited by Jørn Holme, published by Cappelen Damm)

External links
Husan - Farsunds rådhus
Husan, Farsunds rådhus

1773 births
1832 deaths
People from Farsund
Norwegian merchants
Fathers of the Constitution of Norway
Members of the Storting
19th-century Norwegian businesspeople